MV Christinaki was a Maltese bulk carrier which sank in the Atlantic Ocean  south west of Ireland during a force 10 gale with a cargo of scrap metal and 27 crew while she was travelling from Liverpool, United Kingdom to Vera Cruz.

Construction 
Christinaki was constructed in 1973 at the Upper Clyde Shipbuilders Ltd. shipyard in Govan, Scotland, United Kingdom. She was launched on 29 June 1972 and completed on 1 February 1973 for Irish Shipping and was named MV Irish Pine and switched owners and names several times before her demise in 1994.
She had a 1 x 6cyl. 2SA Kincaid-B&W 6K74EF engine driving a single screw propeller, the engine was rated at 11.400 b.h.p.

Sinking 
On 2 February 1994, Christinaki left Liverpool, United Kingdom with a cargo of scrap metal bound for Vera Cruz.

The ship quickly took on water as the hold hatch covers failed. The crew, knowing that the ship was taking in water and was in mortal danger quickly radioed a distress signal at 4 PM. The last radio contact was made at 4:30 PM, at this time the ship is believed to have sunk. Rescuers searched the following day for any survivors near the last known location of the ship but it was soon clear that the 27 Greek and Filipino crew members had perished.

References

Ships of Malta
Ships built in Govan
1972 ships
Shipwrecks in the Atlantic Ocean
Maritime incidents in 1994
Ships lost with all hands